Mateh Yehuda Regional Council (Mo'atza Azorit Mateh Yehuda) is a regional council in the Jerusalem District of Israel. In 2008 it was home to 36,200 people.

The name of the regional council stems from the fact that its territory was part of the land allotted to the Tribe of Judah, according to the Bible.

Places and communities
The regional council administers moshavim, kibbutzim, Arab villages and other rural settlements in the Jerusalem corridor, north and south of the Jerusalem-Tel Aviv highway, from Jerusalem in the southeast to Latrun in the northwest, and down to the area of Beit Shemesh (Ha'ela Valley) in the south.

The settlements vary greatly in their character. There are religious, secular and mixed Jewish communities, two Arab communities, and the only mixed Arab-Jewish village in Israel - Neve Shalom. Many of the Jewish communities in the Mateh Yehuda district were established by immigrants from India, Yemen, Iraq, Iran and countries in Eastern Europe.

30% of the lands of the Palestinian village of Battir in the West Bank, as well as a few of its buildings, lie on the Israeli side of the Green Line. These parts of Battir are nominally within the regional council's area of jurisdiction, but authority over them is exercised by the PA municipality of Battir in practice.

List of villages
Jewish collective villages (Kibbutzim)
Harel · Kiryat Anavim · Ma'ale HaHamisha · Nahshon · Netiv HaLamed-Heh · Ramat Rachel · Tzora · Tzova
Jewish cooperative villages (Moshavim)
Aderet · Agur · Aminadav · Aviezer · Bar Giora · Beit Zayit · Beit Meir · Beit Nekofa · Bekoa · Eshtaol · Even Sapir · Gefen · Givat Ye'arim · Givat Yeshayahu · Kfar Uria · Kisalon · Luzit · Mevo Beitar · Mata · Mahsia · Mesilat Zion · Naham · Nehusha · Nes Harim · Neve Ilan · Neve Michael · Ora · Ramat Raziel · Sdot Micha · Sho'eva · Shoresh · Ta'oz · Tal Shahar · Tarum · Tirosh · Tzafririm · Tzelafon · Yad HaShmona · Yish'i · Zanoah · Zekharia
Community settlements
Nataf · Srigim · Tzur Hadassah · Gizo · Motza Illit 
Arab villages
Ein Naqquba · Ein Rafa
Arab-Jewish village
Neve Shalom
Other settlements
Battir · Deir Rafat · Ein Kerem Agricultural School · Eitanim · Givat Shemesh · Kfar Zoharim · Kiryat Ye'arim Youth Village · Yedida

Tourism
The tourist activities in the area include mountain hiking, major sections on the Israel National Trail, biking and historical sight seeing. Other attractions include natural phenomenon as Avshalom stalactites cave and natural water springs. Mate Yehuda is also home to goat cheese farms, over 30 wineries, including award-winning Katlav and Nevo, 11 breweries and dozens of artists.

Partnerships
The regional council has sister city-like partnerships with these municipalities:
  Vantaa, Finland
  Würzburg district, Bavaria, Germany
  Nümbrecht, North Rhine-Westphalia, Germany
  Dorohoi, Romania

The regional council and Beit Shemesh are linked to South Africa and Washington, D.C., in the Partnership 2gether program of the Jewish Agency for Israel.

References

External links
Official website 

 
1964 establishments in Israel
Regional councils in Israel
Regional councils in Jerusalem District